WMAS-FM (94.7 MHz) – branded 94.7 WMAS – is a commercial adult contemporary radio station licensed to Enfield, Connecticut. Owned by Audacy, Inc., the station serves Springfield, Massachusetts; the Springfield metropolitan area; and the Pioneer Valley of Western Massachusetts; and is also the Springfield affiliate for John Tesh and Jim Brickman. This is despite being in the Hartford, Connecticut, market. The WMAS-FM studios are located at the Naismith Memorial Basketball Hall of Fame located in Springfield, while the station transmitter resides in Springfield's Brightwood neighborhood.

History

Early years
In 1947, the station signed on as WMAS-FM, the FM counterpart of WMAS (1450 AM). Both stations were owned by WMAS, Inc. and mostly simulcast their programming.  Studios were in the Hotel Stonehaven and the stations' city of license was Springfield.

The simulcast ended in the late 1960s. WMAS-FM became an "underground" radio station, playing a freeform radio format of progressive rock. The programs were hosted by youthful disc jockeys (DJs) who could choose whatever they wanted to play. Advertising revenue came from the hippie boutiques, head shops, concert venues, and music stores that catered to the counter-cultural youth of the day.

This freeform radio format ended in September 1969 after complaints were made about expletives in a Wild Man Fischer song. A protest movement, in part organized by the DJs, failed to save the format. From 1971 to 1973, the station programmed a tamer album rock sound, using the call sign WHVY.

In the mid 1970s, the WMAS-FM call letters returned. Both the AM and FM stations were mostly simulcast once again, with a full service, middle of the road music format. In 1978, WMAS-FM hopped on the bandwagon of the disco music sound, although it was short-lived.

In 1979, WMAS-FM began airing a soft adult contemporary format, a forerunner of what the station is today.
In June 2004, WMAS-AM-FM were sold to Citadel Broadcasting for $22 million; In January 2011, WMAS-FM agreed to change its city of license from Springfield to Enfield, Connecticut, to facilitate the relocation of WPKX (97.9) from Enfield to Windsor Locks; the deal, which allowed Citadel to use a generator owned by WPKX owner Clear Channel Communications in Albuquerque, New Mexico, did not require any changes to WMAS-FM's physical and studio facilities. Citadel merged with Cumulus Media on September 16, 2011.

The station won the Massachusetts Broadcasters Association Award for "Station of the Year" in 2012 and 2014. The Kellogg Krew Morning Show won the Massachusetts Broadcasters Association "Air Talent of the Year" award in 2013.

On February 13, 2019, Cumulus and Entercom announced an agreement in which WMAS-FM and WHLL, as well as WNSH in New York City, would be swapped to Entercom in exchange for Entercom's Indianapolis stations. Under the terms of the deal, Entercom began operating WMAS-FM under a local marketing agreement on March 1, 2019. The station's web presence moved to Radio.com a month later, along with its streaming. The swap was completed on May 9, 2019.

References

External links

MAS-FM
Mainstream adult contemporary radio stations in the United States
Audacy, Inc. radio stations
Radio stations established in 1947
1947 establishments in Massachusetts